Quillaja brasiliensis  is a plant of the genus Quillaja native to Brazil.

References

External links
 
 

brasiliensis
Flora of Brazil